This list contains notable people associated with Kent School in Kent, Connecticut, including alumni and current and former faculty.

Alumni

Arts and entertainment
Richard Arnest, class of 1968, composer, performer
Newman Taylor Baker, class of 1961, percussionist, composer
John Biddle, yachting cinematographer and lecturer; inducted into America's Cup Hall of Fame
Lawrence Casserley, class of 1959, composer, performer, conductor
Frankie Celenza, class of 2005, chef, cooking show host
Alicia Coppola, class of 1986, actress
Ted Danson, class of 1966, Emmy and Golden Globe winning actor, notably in Cheers
Lana Del Rey (Elizabeth Grant), class of 2003, singer
Sean Durkin, class of 2000, film director
Emme (Melissa Aronson), class of 1981,  plus-size supermodel
Peter Farrelly, class of 1975, writer, producer, director (Outside Providence, Dumb and Dumber)
Mamie Gummer, class of 2001, (daughter of Meryl Streep), actress
Robert Hillyer, class of 1913, Pulitzer Prize winning poet
Joseph Kaiser, class of 1995, Metropolitan Opera star, operatic tenor
Seth MacFarlane, class of 1991, actor, voice actor, animator, writer, producer, director, singer, comedian (best known for creating Family Guy)
Grayson McCouch, class of 1987, actor
Daniel Richter, choreographer, actor 2001: A Space Odyssey
Roger Sessions, class of 1911, composer, critic, teacher of music
Barclay Shaw, class of 1968, artist
Mandy Stein, class of 1994, film producer
KT Tunstall, class of 1993,  musician
Will Wallace, class of 1984, film director
Treat Williams, class of 1969, actor

Athletics
Johnny Bent, class of 1926, silver medalist with the American hockey team in the 1932 Winter Olympics
Étienne Boulay, class of 2002, Canadian football player
Jack Capuano, class of 1985, Head Coach, New York Islanders
Steve Gladstone, class of 1960, rowing coach
Billy Jaffe, class of 1987, sports analyst
Ryan Leib, professional soccer player
H. Graham Motion, class of 1983, horse trainer
Christophe Mulumba-Tshimanga, Canadian football player
Winthrop Palmer, class of 1926, silver medalist with the American hockey team in the 1932 Winter Olympics
Scott Perry, NFL football player
Carl-Olivier Primé, Canadian football player
David Quinn, class of 1984, hockey player for Minnesota North Stars, Former head coach for Boston University, and Head Coach of the New York Rangers
William Stowe, class of 1958, Olympic gold medalist in rowing
Noel Acciari. class of 2011, NHL Boston Bruins 2015 – 2019 Florida Panthers 2019 - Current
Cristoval Nieves "Boo", class of 2012, NHL New York Rangers (2016 – 2020) and Tampa Bay Lightning (2021–present)

Business
Jonathan Harmsworth, 4th Viscount Rothermere, Chairman of Daily Mail and General Trust (post-graduate year)

Engineering and science
Craig Call Black, class of 1950, paleontologist
Thomas Elliot Bowman III, class of 1938, carcinologist
Schuyler V. Cammann, class of 1931, anthropologist
Flemming Gomme Graae, class of 1967, psychiatrist
John S. Meyer, class of 1941, neurologist
Ilhi Synn, class of 1958, educator
Bruno H. Zimm, class of 1938, polymer chemist and DNA researcher

Government, politics, and law
John A. Baldwin, Jr., class of 1950, United States Navy Vice Admiral
Jacob D. Beam, U.S. Ambassador to the Soviet Union, 1969–73
His Royal Highness Prince Carl Philip Edmund Bertil, Duke of Värmland, third in line to the Swedish throne (left in his tenth year to attend finishing school)
Christopher Burnham, class of 1975, diplomat
Peter Carlisle, class of 1970, Mayor and former Prosecuting Attorney of Honolulu
Richard Dearlove, class of 1963, former Chief of MI6, British Secret Intelligence Service (1999–2004)
Alexandra Davis DiPentima, class of 1971, Chief Judge of the Connecticut Appellate Court
Hamilton Fish IV, Congressman from New York, 1969–95
Howard Hart, class of 1958, Central Intelligence Agency officer
Draper Kauffman, class of 1929, Navy Rear Admiral; considered the father of Navy Frogmen; grandfather of Navy SEALs
Stewart McKinney, Congressman from Connecticut
Stephanie Nyombayire, class of 2004, activist
Carlton Powell, class of 1957, judge
Whitney North Seymour Jr., U.S. Attorney for the Southern District of New York, prominent lawyer, New York State Senator
John A. Shaw, class of 1957, former civil servant who held positions under several presidents
J. Fife Symington Jr., class of 1929, airline pioneer and former US Ambassador to Trinidad and Tobago
Cyrus Vance, class of 1935, former US Secretary of State
Tommy Vitolo, class of 1996, member of the Massachusetts House of Representatives, 2019–present
Michael Webert, class of 1998, member of the Virginia House of Delegates, 2012–present
Dinghy Young, class of 1932, World War II "Dambuster" pilot
Marie L. Yovanovitch, class of 1976, diplomat, U.S. Department of State official, U.S. Ambassador to Armenia, Kyrgyzstan, and Ukraine

Writers, journalists and publishers
Bruce Beattie, class of 1972, political cartoonist
John Brooks, class of 1938, writer
Oliver Butterworth, class of 1933, writer and educator
James Gould Cozzens, class of 1925, novelist, Pulitzer Prize recipient in 1949 for Guard of Honor; wrote By Love Possessed
Wilbur Cross, class of 1937, author
Vine Deloria, Jr. (Standing Rock Sioux), class of 1951, author (Custer Died for Your Sins, 1969), theologian, historian, and Native American activist
Chard deNiord, class of 1971, poet, poet laureate of Vermont
P. G. Downes, class of 1928, explorer, educator, author
Rowland Evans, class of 1939, columnist, journalist, co-host of Evans & Novak on CNN
Oscar Gonzáles, class of 1989, writer
Ashbel Green, class of 1945, editor at Alfred A. Knopf 
James Grinwis, class of 1990, poet
Robert Hillyer, class of 1913, poet
Stu Kennedy, class of 1946, historian
Charles P. Kindleberger, class of 1928, historical economist, author
Sidney D. Kirkpatrick, award-winning documentary filmmaker and bestselling historical author
Libby Koponen, award-winning author and freelance writer. Titles include BLOW OUT THE MOON (Little, Brown 2004) and THE HOUSE BABA BUILT (Little, Brown 2011).
Alfred W. McCoy, class of 1964, historian
Christopher McDougall, class of 1981, bestselling author
Charles Patterson, author and historian
John Rawls, class of 1939, political philosopher, author of A Theory of Justice
Bernard Ryan, Jr., class of 1942, author
Serge Schmemann, class of 1963, reporter, Pulitzer Prize for International Reporting recipient in 1991
Frank W. Wadsworth, class of 1938, scholar, author, and sportsman
Amanda Eyre Ward, class of 1990, author

Faculty
William H. Armstrong, Greek and ancient history teacher for decades; author of Study is Hard Work and the novel Sounder, which received the Newbery Medal in 1970 and was made into an Oscar-nominated movie
Joe Bouchard, music instructor, retired member of rock band Blue Öyster Cult
Edmund Fuller
Michael Page, equestrian

References

Kent
 
Kent School people